Sug-Aksy (Sug-Aksı) is a rural locality (a selo) and the administrative center of Sut-Kholsky District of Tuva, Russia. Population:

References

Notes

Sources

Rural localities in Tuva